Fordwich Airport  is located  northeast of Fordwich, Ontario, Canada.

Located on a farm, the single north/south runway consists of a grass strip with unobstructive trees and a pond at the south end; and a barn, silo and farmhouse at the north end. While the CFS notes that geese roost in the pond, a smudge pot is set up there to keep them away from the runway.

References 

Registered aerodromes in Ontario
Transport in Huron County, Ontario